"Summer" is a song by American singer-songwriter Cassadee Pope from her second extended play, also titled Summer (2016). Pope wrote the song with Kelly Archer and Emily Shackelton. Production was handled by Corey Crowder, who also produced Pope's chart-topping collaboration with Chris Young that year, "Think of You". It serves as the EP's lead single.

The song was made available to American country radio stations on May 23, 2016 via PlayMPE and was officially sent for adds through Republic Nashville on June 6, 2016. It was released to digital retailers June 3, 2016 as part of the Summer EP.

Reception

Critical
Matt Bjorke of Roughstock wrote that "Summer" is a "radio-ready" anthem with hit potential and which demonstrates how Pope has "grown into her country music career." Taste of Country and Sounds Like Nashville both praised the song as a highlight from the EP. Writing for the former, Billy Dukes praised Pope's delivery as "easy to believe."

Commercial 
"Summer" debuted at number 59 on the Billboard Country Airplay chart dated June 25, 2016.

Music video
The music video for "Summer" was filmed at the Opal Sands Resort, and on the Clearwater Beach Boardwalk in Clearwater Beach, FL and was directed by TK McKamy. It premiered June 3, 2016 in conjunction with the song's digital release. Inspired by events Pope experienced at age seventeen, the video recounts a summer fling between Pope and a love interest played by Sam Krumrine

Live performances
Pope has performed "Summer" as part of her setlist on Chris Young's I'm Comin' Over Tour since February 25, 2016.

Chart performance

References

2016 songs
2016 singles
Cassadee Pope songs
Republic Nashville singles
Songs written by Cassadee Pope
Songs written by Kelly Archer
Music videos directed by TK McKamy
Songs written by Emily Shackelton